Rhythm 0 was a six-hour work of performance art by Serbian artist Marina Abramović in  Naples in 1974. The work involved Abramović standing still while the audience was invited to do to her whatever they wished, using one of 72 objects she had placed on a table. These included a rose, feather, perfume, honey, bread, grapes, wine, scissors, a scalpel, nails, a metal bar, a gun, and a bullet.

There were no separate stages. Abramović and the visitors stood in the same space, making it clear that the latter were part of the work. The purpose of the piece, she said, was to find out how far the public would go: "What is the public about and what are they going to do in this kind of situation?"

Performance
Her instructions were  

Abramović said the work "pushed her body to the limits". Visitors were gentle to begin with, offering her a rose or a kiss. Art critic Thomas McEvilley, who was present, wrote:

As Abramović described it later: "What I learned was that ... if you leave it up to the audience, they can kill you ... I felt really violated: they cut up my clothes, stuck rose thorns in my stomach, one person aimed the gun at my head, and another took it away. It created an aggressive atmosphere. After exactly 6 hours, as planned, I stood up and started walking toward the audience. Everyone ran away, to escape an actual confrontation."

When the gallery announced the work was over, and Abramović began to move again, she said the audience left, unable to face her as a person.

Reception
Rhythm 0 ranked ninth on a Complex list of the greatest works of performance art ever done.

See also
 Endurance art
 The Death of The Artist
 Empathy and Prostitution
 Stanford prison experiment
 Milgram experiment

References

External links
 Marina Abramovic on performing Rhythm 0 (1974)

Performances
1974 in art